Coup De Grace is the fourth full-length album by British stoner metal band Orange Goblin, released in 2002 on Rise Above Records and The Music Cartel. Guest appearances include John Garcia of Kyuss and Tom Davies of Nebula.

In late January 2011, Rise Above Records reissued the album in a digipack form containing three bonus tracks; No Law (taken from the earlier High Times release), No Class (Motörhead cover) and Freelance Fiend (Leafhound cover).

Track listing

Personnel 
 Ben Ward – vocals
 Pete O'Malley – guitar
 Martyn Millard – bass
 Chris Turner – drums
 Joe Hoare – guitar

Guest musicians 
 John Garcia – lead vocals on "Made of Rats" and "Jesus Beater"
 Tom Davies – backing vocals on "Monkey Panic"

Notes 
"We Bite" is a cover of a Misfits song originally released on the Die, Die My Darling EP in 1984.
"Your World Will Hate This" is featured on the 2003 video game Tony Hawk's Underground.
Man's Ruin Records founder Frank Kozik, who had released past Orange Goblin records, produced the album's artwork.

References 

2002 albums
Orange Goblin albums
Rise Above Records albums